Our Emden (German: Unsere Emden) is a 1926 German silent war film directed by Louis Ralph. It depicts the operations of the German First World War cruiser SMS Emden. In 1932 Ralph remade the story as a sound film Cruiser Emden.

It was made at the Emelka Studios in Munich. The film's sets were designed by the art directors Botho Hoefer and Ludwig Reiber.

Cast
 Louis Ralph 
 Fritz Greiner 
 John Mylong 
 Charles Willy Kayser 
 Maria Mindzenty

See also
How We Fought the Emden (1915)
The Exploits of the Emden (1928)
Cruiser Emden (1932)
Die Männer der Emden (2012)

References

Bibliography
 Daniel Reynaud. Celluloid Anzacs: The Great War Through Australian Cinema. 2007.

External links

1926 films
Films of the Weimar Republic
German silent feature films
Films directed by Louis Ralph
1926 war films
German World War I films
World War I naval films
World War I films based on actual events
German black-and-white films
Bavaria Film films
Films shot at Bavaria Studios
German historical films
1920s war adventure films
Silent war adventure films
1920s German films
1920s German-language films